Pink Wall is a 2019 British independent romantic drama film written and directed by Tom Cullen and starring Tatiana Maslany and Jay Duplass.  It is Cullen's directorial debut.

Plot
Pink Wall is the story of a couple's struggles with the pressures of gender expectations.

Cast
Tatiana Maslany as Jenna
Jay Duplass as Leon
Sule Rimi as Scott
Ruth Ollman as Layla
Sarah Ovens as Jess
T.J. Richardson as Frankie
Kyle Lima as Obi

Reception
Pink Wall received generally positive critical reviews.

Ella Kemp of Empire awarded the film four stars out of five.

David Ehrlich of IndieWire graded the film a B.

Clarisse Loughrey of The Independent awarded the film three stars out of five.

Brian Tallerico of RogerEbert.com gave the film a positive review and wrote that it “ works because Cullen trusts his very talented performers, building characters with them and then amplifying the themes of their journey through his experimental visual language. It’s an ultimately moving, very impressive debut.”

Chris Longo of Den of Geek awarded the film three and a half stars out of five.

References

External links
 

2019 films
2019 romantic drama films
British romantic drama films
2019 directorial debut films
British independent films
2010s English-language films
2010s British films
2019 independent films